Juigné-sur-Loire (literally Juigné on Loire) is a former commune in the Maine-et-Loire department in western France. On 15 December 2016 it was merged into the new commune Les Garennes sur Loire.

On 18 July 1969 Juigné-sur-Loire was the site of a tragic accident that killed 19 young teenagers from nearby Angers.  The children, part of a group of sixty 13- and 14-year-olds on an outing from a recreational center, had been wading in the Loire river when the gravel riverbed beneath them gave way and swept them downstream into the deeper waters.

See also
Communes of the Maine-et-Loire department

References

Juignesurloire
Maine-et-Loire communes articles needing translation from French Wikipedia